The Zastava M90 is an assault rifle developed and produced by Zastava Arms in Serbia (formerly the Socialist Republic of Serbia, Yugoslavia). It was developed from the Zastava M70 assault rifle, a modified copy of the Soviet AKM, but with a Western-type flash eliminator added on the barrel end, chambered in the Western 5.56×45mm NATO caliber, and with a different magazine design, similar to a STANAG magazine.

The M90 was intended to replace the M70 in the Yugoslav Army, but the breakup of Yugoslavia disrupted the production and the weapon today remains rare and was never formally used.

Overview
The Zastava M90 is the modified version of Zastava M80, itself a version of the Zastava M70 (chambered in the Western 5.56×45mm NATO round), also comes with a flash eliminator and different magazine design, which means that like its predecessor, the M90 is a modified Soviet AKM. It is gas-operated, air-cooled and magazine-fed, shoulder fired weapon with selective fire capability, and like M70, can launch rifle grenades and has a rifle grenade sight added on the gas tube, instead of under barrel grenade launcher like on most other AK variants. It also incorporates the adjustable gas system from its M76, M77 and B1 cousins, with the third gas position being the gas cutoff for grenades.

Like all Zastava-produced AK variants, the M90 can be identified from the originals by its longer lower wooden handguard design, which has three cooling vents, no bulge and like the stock, is made out of different wood type. Also, due to using Western round, this particular model also has different magazine design, similar to Western STANAG and a Western type flash eliminator, similar to one used on American M16 assault rifle. Like on the other Zastava AK's, this three vent feature gives the M90 lower overheating when compared to the originals, but, the Western round in this case, slightly reduces reliability.

Variants
 Zastava M90 – Standard variant with fixed wooden stock.
 Zastava M90A – Variant with a fixed wooden stock being replaced with an AKMS style underfolding metallic one.
 Zastava M90NP – Variant with a fixed polymer stock and an added polymer adapter to accept AR15 style magazines.
 Zastava M85 – Carbine; shortened variant of the M90A assault rifle.
Zastava USA M90 – Variant designed for import into the United States. Comes with an adjustable gas block, side-folding stock, and new polymer magazines.

See also
 Zastava M21
 List of assault rifles

References

External links
 Zastava Arms

M85 M90
5.56×45mm NATO assault rifles
Zastava Arms
Kalashnikov derivatives